Rajagopal Sathish (born 14 January 1981) is an Indian former first-class cricketer who played as an all-rounder.

He was captain of the India XI in the Indian Cricket League Twenty20 competition. He played for Tamil Nadu in the Ranji Trophy and for Kolkata Knight Riders in the Indian Premier League.

Satish is a mechanical engineering student at Jayaram College of Engineering and Technology, Tiruchirappalli, and attended Campion Anglo-Indian Higher Secondary School  in Tiruchirappalli

References

Indian cricketers
Tamil Nadu cricketers
East Zone cricketers
Mumbai Indians cricketers
Assam cricketers
Punjab Kings cricketers
1981 births
Living people
Sportspeople from Tiruchirappalli
ICL India XI cricketers
Chennai Superstars cricketers
Cricketers from Tamil Nadu